Davazdah Emam (also Romanized as Davāzdah Emām) is a village in Khenaman Rural District, in the Central District of Rafsanjan County, Kerman Province, Iran. At the 2006 census, its population was 132, in 39 families.

References 

Populated places in Rafsanjan County